Dendroctonus micans, the great spruce bark beetle, is a species of bark beetle native to the coniferous forests of Europe and Asia. The beetles burrow into the bark of spruce trees and lay eggs which develop into larvae that feed on the woody layers under the bark.

Description 
The eggs of the great spruce bark beetle are smooth, white and translucent, and laid in batches of a hundred or more. The larvae are legless and "C"-shaped, white with darker heads. The pupae are white and "mummy-like"; they are exarate, with legs and wings separate from the body. The limbs and antennae are yellowish-brown, the head is visible when viewed from above, and the elytral declivity, the downward sloping rear end of the elytra, is rounded and smooth.

Distribution 
The great spruce bark beetle occurs in the coniferous forests of Europe and Asia. It is not clear where it originated and to which countries it is endemic, but it has been steadily expanding its range westward in Europe in the last hundred years, assisted by the transport of unprocessed logs. It is present in most of Northern, Eastern and Central Europe and has reached Belgium and France, and was first detected in the United Kingdom in 1982. In Asia, it is present in Hokkaido in Japan, and in the Chinese provinces of Heilongjiang, Liaoning, Qinghai and Sichuan. It has been introduced into Turkey and Georgia, in both of which it is invasive.

Hosts 

The great spruce bark beetle mainly infests spruce trees, genus Picea, but it will also attack Scots pine and several other species of Pinus, silver fir, Nordmann fir, Siberian fir, Douglas fir, and European larch.

Life cycle 

The female beetle excavates a tunnel in the bark of a host tree and creates a brood chamber. Any resin that accumulates is mixed with frass (droppings) and pushed out of the tunnel, creating a purplish-brown mass known as a resin tube. A hundred or more eggs are laid in the brood chamber and the female moves on, either creating another brood chamber near the first or exiting the tree and starting again.

When the eggs hatch, the larvae feed gregariously, chewing their way in a broad front and packing in their frass behind them. There are five larval instars and when the larvae are fully developed, they create individual pupal chambers in the frass and pupate. The total development time varies with temperature and may be one to three years. The new adults may stay under the bark, mining new tunnels and creating new brood chambers, or they may emerge into the open air. Several females may mine the same area and their excavations may coalesce.

Ecology 
The great spruce bark beetle is unusual among members of its genus in that the beetles mate before they emerge from under the bark, while they are not yet fully chitinised. There are many more female than male beetles, often 10/1 but exceptionally 45/1, and the matings are normally incestuous, being between siblings. The beetles emerge into the open air through a round hole which may be used by many beetles. They are weak fliers and many disperse by walking, tunnelling into a different part of the same tree. Others fly to nearby trees, and small groups of trees may be affected. Each tree is weakened by the tunnelling activities of the beetles and larvae; this kills the bark in a limited area, and it may be five to eight years before the tree is girdled and dies.

In an attempt to control this beetle in the United Kingdom, the predatory beetle Rhizophagus grandis has been released. This specifically preys on the great spruce bark beetle and has a great ability to detect the adults and larvae infesting a tree. The predatory beetle is attracted to the frass produced by its prey which contains monoterpenes, and a suitable mixture of synthetic monoterpenes has been used to trap R. grandis in its native range, to provide insects for use in biological control. A rearing and release programme for R. grandis was also undertaken, and between 1984 and 1995, over a hundred and fifty thousand beetles were released in over two thousand sites in northwestern England and Wales, with surrounding areas of forest being quarantined.

References 

Scolytinae
Woodboring beetles
Beetles of Asia
Beetles of Europe
Beetles described in 1794